Arungurukkai village is located in Tirukkoyilur tehsil of Kallakurichi district in Tamil Nadu, India. It is situated 16km away from Tirukkoyilur. As per 2009 stats, Arungurukkai village is also a gram panchayat.

The total geographical area of the village is 718.84 hectares. Arungurukkai has a total population of 4,703 people. There are about 1,003 houses in Arungurukkai village. Tirukkoyilur is the nearest town to Arungurukkai.

References

Villages in Kallakurichi district